"Go Insane" is the title track of Lindsey Buckingham's second solo album. Released as a single in July 1984, it became Buckingham's second top 40 hit (after "Trouble", three years earlier). "Go Insane" is also Buckingham's most recent U.S. solo hit (peaking at #23 in the Billboard Hot 100 chart); on the other hand, it did not chart in the United Kingdom.

Billboard called it "aggressive, electronic dance-rock."

Lyrics
When asked about the lyrics of "Go Insane", he explained:

In later years, Buckingham has stated that the song, "Go Insane", was actually written about his 7-year-old (at that time)  post-break up relationship with former lover, Stevie Nicks.
“We were disintegrating as couples, by virtue of that, we were suffering as people.  So in order to get work done, I had to go through this elaborate exercise in denial – leaving whole areas of baggage on the other side of the room, compartmentalize feelings... no time to get closure, to work things out... working in a very highly charged and ambivalent environment. So the go insane thing – would just be whenever I let my guard down and got back to all the things I hadn’t dealt with, it was almost like going insane – like I always do.  Took a long, long time, working in an artificial environment on a personal level.  So many things not worked through for a long, long time." – Lindsey Buckingham 

“Stevie, at some point her persona onstage was latched onto and she was in a sense called away by a larger world and separated on her own from me.”- Lindsey Buckingham

Personnel
 Lindsey Buckingham – vocals, guitars, keyboards, percussion, Fairlight CMI, LinnDrum
 Bryant Simpson – bass guitar

Chart history

Other versions
At concerts, notably on The Dance, he did an acoustic fingerstyle version of "Go Insane", which featured just him and a nylon-string guitar.
During the 2008 Gift of Screws tour, as well as Fleetwood Mac's 2009 Unleashed tour, he played the original version of the song. He returned to performing the solo acoustic version on his 2011 Seeds We Sow tour.

References

External links
 Lyrics, Interpretation, and Tabs
 

1984 singles
Songs written by Lindsey Buckingham
Lindsey Buckingham songs
1984 songs
Reprise Records singles
Warner Music Group singles